Bellavista de la Unión District is one of six districts of the province Sechura in Peru.

History 
Bellavista de la Unión District was created by Law January 29, 1965, in Fernando Belaúnde term.

Geography

Authorities

Mayors 
 2007-2014: Sixto Miguel Chunga Zapata, Agro Si.
 2003-2006: Tulio Alcides Ramos Chunga, Bellavista al Futuro.
 1999-2002: Félix Cherre Bayona, Unica San Clemente.

See also 
 Administrative divisions of Peru

References

External links 
 INEI Peru